Chalybeate, also known as Chalybeate Springs, is an unincorporated community in Edmonson County, Kentucky, United States, near the Warren County line.

History
At the turn of the 20th century, the location of the springs, which contained iron salts known as chalybeate, long thought to be health-restoring, was a popular resort.  All that remained of the resort by 2010 was an old spring house for the resort, which was initially closed during the Second World War. A Kentucky Historical Marker with information about that resort was placed at the junction of KY 101 and KY 3611 on June 11, 2016.

See also
Chalybeate

References

External links
old post card photo of the resort

Unincorporated communities in Edmonson County, Kentucky
Unincorporated communities in Kentucky
Bowling Green metropolitan area, Kentucky